Bavaj (also Romanized as Bāvaj) is a village in Abolfares Rural District, in the Central District of Ramhormoz County, Khuzestan Province, Iran. At the 2006 census, its population was 594, in 112 families.

References 

Populated places in Ramhormoz County